The 2021 Kilkenny Senior Hurling League was the 28th staging of the Kilkenny Senior Hurling League since its establishment by the Kilkenny County Board in 1992. The league began on 4 September 2021 and ended on 3 October 2021.

Dicksboro were the defending champions, however, they failed to make it out of the group stage.

On 3 October 2021, Bennettsbridge won the league after beating Clara by 0–19 to 0–16 at UPMC Nowlan Park. It was their first ever league title.

Results

Group stage

Group A table

Group B results

Group B table

Group B results

Knockout stage

Shield final

Final

References

Hurling competitions in Leinster
Hurling competitions in County Kilkenny